Sir Eoin O'Gallagher was an influential Irish figure in the Gaelic lordship of Tyrconnell during the Elizabethan era. He was head of the O'Gallagher family and the chief advisor to the O'Donnell dynasty who ruled Tyrconnell. He was the son of Tuathal Balbh O'Gallagher (a previous renowned chief of his name). He came to prominence during the rule of Sir Hugh O'Donnell. His good relationship with the Crown is shown by his being awarded an annual pension in 1574 and a knighthood in 1581.

He married Siobhán Maguire, the widow of Matthew O'Neill, 1st Baron Dungannon who had been assassinated in 1558, and therefore became stepfather to Hugh O'Neill, Earl of Tyrone and his brothers Cormac and Art.

During the long O'Donnell succession dispute in the 1580s and 1590s, he backed Hugh Roe O'Donnell, who eventually triumphed and was acknowledged by the Crown.

References

Bibliography
 Morgan, Hiram. Tyrone's Rebellion. Boydell Press, 1999.

16th-century Irish people
People of Elizabethan Ireland
Irish knights
Year of birth unknown
Year of death unknown
People from County Donegal